Capacité 11 personnes is a Canadian comedy-drama short film, directed by Gaëlle d'Ynglemare and released in 2004. Set entirely in the elevator of an office building, the film depicts the interactions of various passengers as the elevator travels up and down the building. Its cast includes Nancy Bernier, Nicolas Canuel, Jean-Marie Corbeil, Évelyne de la Chenelière, Tristan Dubois, Marc Fortin, Bruno Landry, Linda Laplante, Denis Mercier and Pierre Verville.

The film was commercially distributed as an opening film at screenings of John L'Ecuyer's feature On the Verge of a Fever (Le Goût des jeunes filles) in 2005.

The film won the Genie Award for Best Live Action Short Drama at the 21st Genie Awards.

References

External links
 

2004 films
2004 comedy-drama films
Canadian comedy-drama films
Best Live Action Short Drama Genie and Canadian Screen Award winners
Quebec films
2004 short films
2000s French-language films
French-language Canadian films
Canadian drama short films
Canadian comedy short films
2000s Canadian films